The Norway women's national basketball team represents Norway in international women's basketball competition. The national team is controlled by the Norwegian Basketball Federation (NBBF). The Norway women's national team played at the 2018 FIBA Women's European Championship for Small Countries, and finished the tournament in fourth place.

References

External links
Official website 
Norway at FIBA site
Norway National Team - Women at Eurobasket.com

Basketball in Norway
Women's national basketball teams
1968 establishments in Norway
B